Sun Wenlong (born 21 February 1989) is a Chinese former footballer.

Career statistics

Club

References

1989 births
Living people
Chinese footballers
Chinese expatriate footballers
Association football defenders
Singapore Premier League players
China League Two players
Dalian Shide F.C. players
Chinese expatriate sportspeople in Singapore
Expatriate footballers in Singapore